The National Standard Examination in Biology or NSEB is an examination  for  biology for higher secondary school students in India, usually conducted in the end of November. The examination is organized by the Association of Teachers in Biological Sciences in association with Indian Association of Physics Teachers and Homi Bhabha Centre for Science Education (HBCSE). Each year over 30,000 students of 12th Standard or below , sit for this examination.

Eligibility

The examination is intended for students in 12th standard, though 11th standard students are also allowed to give the examination. Usually, the qualifying students are from 12th standard.

Qualification

There is a designated statewise quota according to which the students are selected for the next stage i.e. INBO. Further all students scoring greater than 80% of the average of the top ten scores at national level(called as Merit Index Score) get automatically selected irrespective of the statewise quota.
Usually the top 1% students from this examination are selected to sit for the Indian National Biology Olympiad.

Format

The NSEB comprises only multiple choice questions. The questions include plant physiology, genetics and human physiology. The stress on biochemistry is more in the NSEB than in the typical school syllabi.

Fee

As per new revised norms the fee for the NSEB is about Rs. 150. Application for this examination is typically handled through the school/college to which the student is affiliated.

Indian National Biology Olympiad 
It's held in January, and consists of objective as well as subjective questions. The top 35 performers here, are selected for the Orientation-Cum-Selection-Camp (OCSC), Biology , where they're trained and tested in theory and experiment. The top 4 performers from OCSC Biology are selected to represent India in the International Biology Olympiad.

Before IBO, the selected team undergoes rigorous training in theory and experiment, in a Pre-Departure Training Camp (PDC).

References

School examinations in India